John Bowstead (14 May 1872 – 7 January 1939) was an English first-class cricketer active 1909 who played for Middlesex. He was born in Penrith, Cumberland; died in Ealing.

References

1872 births
1939 deaths
English cricketers
Middlesex cricketers